Bagauda may refer to the following.

Bagauda, the first monarch of the Kingdom of Kano
Bagauda Dynasty of Kano
Bagauda, a genus of thread-legged bugs
Bagauda, Nepal, a village development committee (VDC) in Nepal
Bagaudae, Ancient Roman peasants